William B. Bailey (December 11, 1892 – October 25, 1977) was an American politician who served as Registrar of Deeds for the Southern Middlesex District and was a member of the Massachusetts House of Representatives.

Early life
Bailey was born on December 11, 1892 in Somerville, Massachusetts. He attended public schools in Somerville, Benjamin Franklin Institute of Technology, and Wentworth Institute of Technology.  Bailey served in the United States Army during World War I and mustered out with the rank of sergeant.

Political career
From 1942 to 1945, Bailey was a member of the Somerville school committee. From 1947 to 1949 he was represented the 24th Middlesex District in the Massachusetts House of Representatives. In 1947 he was an unsuccessful candidate for mayor of Somerville. In 1950 he was a candidate for Secretary of the Commonwealth. He finished fourth in the Republican primary with 15% of the vote. In 1952 Bailey defeated Democratic incumbent James F. Fitzgerald  to become Registrar of Deeds for the Southern Middlesex District. In 1958, he was defeated for reelection by Edmund C. Buckley. In 1962, Bailey was an unsuccessful candidate for Middlesex County commissioner. Bailey was also a member of the Somerville board of assessors for 16 years.

Bailey died on October 25, 1977 at his home in Somerville.

See also
 1947–1948 Massachusetts legislature

References

1892 births
1977 deaths
Benjamin Franklin Institute of Technology alumni
Wentworth Institute of Technology alumni
Republican Party members of the Massachusetts House of Representatives
People from Somerville, Massachusetts
Registers of deeds in Massachusetts
20th-century American politicians